Harry or Henry Parks may refer to:

Harry Parks (cricketer) (1906–1984), English cricketer
Harry Jeremiah Parks (1848–1927), U.S. Army soldier and Medal of Honor recipient
H. B. Parks (Henry Blanton Parks, 1856–1936), African American clergyman
Henry G. Parks Jr. (1916–1989), American businessman

See also
Harry Parkes (disambiguation)